The 1991 Laurence Olivier Awards were held in 1991 in London celebrating excellence in West End theatre by the Society of London Theatre.

Winners and nominees
Details of winners (in bold) and nominees, in each award category, per the Society of London Theatre.

Productions with multiple nominations and awards
The following 17 productions, including one ballet and one opera, received multiple nominations:

 7: Into the Woods
 6: Sunday in the Park with George and The Wind in the Willows
 5: Show Boat
 4: Dancing at Lughnasa and Five Guys Named Moe
 3: Richard III, The Rehearsal and White Chameleon
 2: Accidental Death of an Anarchist, Duke Bluebeard's Castle, Pericles, Singer, The Illusion, The Trackers of Oxyrhynchus, The Wild Duck and Winter Dreams

The following six productions received multiple awards:

 2: Five Guys Named Moe, Into the Woods, Pericles, Richard III, Show Boat and Sunday in the Park with George

See also
 45th Tony Awards

References

External links
 Previous Olivier Winners – 1991

Laurence Olivier Awards ceremonies
Laurence Olivier Awards, 1991
Laurence Olivier Awards
Laurence Olivier Awards